Jamaica is a station in Mexico City Metro. It is located in Venustiano Carranza borough, in Mexico City and serves the Sevilla neighbourhood.

General information
The station logo depicts an ear of corn. Its name refers to the nearby wholesale market of Jamaica.

This station combines both elevated viaducts for line 4 and underground passages for line 9. The distance between platforms is long, as are the station's exits. Metro Jamaica has a cultural display.

Ridership

Nearby
Mercado de Jamaica, public market.

Exits

Line 4
East: Avenida Congreso de la Unión and José María Roa Bárcenas street, Colonia Mixiuhca
West: Avenida Congreso de la Unión and José María Roa Bárcenas street, Colonia Sevilla

Line 9
Northeast: Avenida Congreso de la Unión and Cincel street, Colonia Jamaica
Southeast: Avenida Congreso de la Unión, Colonia Jamaica
Northwest: Avenida Morelos and Compás street, Colonia Sevilla
Southwest: Avenida Morelos, Colonia Sevilla

See also 
 Mercado Jamaica, Mexico City

References 

Jamaica
Railway stations opened in 1982
1982 establishments in Mexico
Railway stations opened in 1987
1987 establishments in Mexico
Mexico City Metro Line 9 stations
Mexico City Metro stations in Venustiano Carranza, Mexico City
Accessible Mexico City Metro stations